Jakub Ficenec (born February 11, 1977) is a Czech-German professional ice hockey defenceman currently playing for Düsseldorfer EG of the Deutsche Eishockey Liga (DEL).

Playing career
Ficenec made his professional debut during the 1993–94 season, appearing in two games in the Czech Extraliga. In 1995–96 he appeared in three games with HC Slavia Praha.

Beginning in 1996, Ficenec played five season in North America. He played two seasons of junior ice hockey with the South Surrey Eagles of the British Columbia Hockey League. During the 1998–99 season he made his American professional debut, playing 59 games with the Johnstown Chiefs of the ECHL, and five with the Portland Pirates of the American Hockey League. The next two seasons he played in Portland.

In 2001, he began playing in the German league with the Augsburger Panthers. The next season, he played with DEG Metro Stars. In 2003, he joined ERC Ingolstadt.

Ficenec competed at the 2010 Winter Olympics as a member of the Germany men's national ice hockey team.

Career statistics

Regular season and playoffs

International

References

External links
 

1977 births
Living people
Anaheim Bullfrogs players
Augsburger Panther players
DEG Metro Stars players
Düsseldorfer EG players
ERC Ingolstadt players
German ice hockey defencemen
HC Slavia Praha players
Ice hockey players at the 2010 Winter Olympics
Johnstown Chiefs players
Las Vegas Coyotes players
Olympic ice hockey players of Germany
Sportspeople from Hradec Králové
Surrey Eagles players
Portland Pirates players
Czech ice hockey defencemen
Czech expatriate ice hockey players in Germany
Naturalized citizens of Germany
Naturalised sports competitors
Czech expatriate ice hockey players in the United States
Czech expatriate ice hockey players in Canada